Min Min is an uninhabited outback locality in the Shire of Boulia, Queensland, Australia. The locality is most notable for the Min Min light, an unexplained aerial phenomenon reported throughout Australia's outback that was first observed by Europeans at Min Min (the phenomenon was known to Indigenous people prior to European settlement). The settlement is now a ghost town.

Geography 
Min Min is in the Channel Country. All watercourses in this area are part of the Lake Eyre drainage basin, and most will dry up before their water reaches Lake Eyre.

The predominant land use is grazing on native vegetation.

History
The town is most famous for being the source for the name of the aerial phenomenon the Min Min light. One of the earliest recorded European encounters with the light comes from a stockman who lived in Min Min in 1918. 

Education 
There are no schools in Min Min. The nearest primary school is in Boulia. The nearest secondary schools are in Mount Isa and Winton and are too far for a daily commute. The Spinifex State College in Mount Isa offers boarding facilities. Other boarding schools or distance education would be options.

See also 
 List of reduplicated Australian place names

References 

Shire of Boulia
Localities in Queensland
Ghost towns in Queensland